Ostrožac is a village in the municipality of Cazin, Bosnia and Herzegovina.

Ostrožac Castle is locate here.

History 
It was first mentioned in 1286 as the city of the Dukes of Blagaj. It was occupied by the Turks in 1577.

Demographics 
According to the 2013 census, its population was 2,068.

References

Populated places in Cazin